Our Rice House is a modern Singaporean Chinese 8 episode family drama which is telecast on Singapore's free-to-air channel, MediaCorp TV Channel 8. It made its debut on 4 February 2008.

Cast

Main cast
 Thomas Ong as Da Fan
 Cavin Soh as Xiao Fan
 Aileen Tan as Li Ying
 Michelle Chong as Ting Ting

Supporting cast
Chen Guohua as An Ge
Michelle Tay as Sally
Pan Hongjin as Ma La Ji

Viewership ratings

Singapore Chinese dramas
2008 Singaporean television series debuts
Channel 8 (Singapore) original programming